Kildara or Killara (Κιλλαρα) was a town of ancient Caria. It was a polis (city-state) and was in a sympoliteia with Theangela and Thodosa. Kildara is the find-spot of numerous inscriptions in the Carian language and is the name of one specific type of Carian script.
 
Its site is located near Asardağ, Asiatic Turkey.

References

Populated places in ancient Caria
Former populated places in Turkey
Greek city-states
Archaeological sites in Turkey
Milas District
History of Muğla Province